Atam Nagar Assembly constituency (Sl. No.: 62) is a Punjab Legislative Assembly constituency in Ludhiana district, Punjab state, India.

Members of the Legislative Assembly

Election results

2022

2017

Previous Results

References

External links
  

Assembly constituencies of Punjab, India
Ludhiana district